Shustov may refer to
Shustov (surname)
Shustov vodka
 9145 Shustov, a minor planet